The capilla posa is the architectural solution used in the monastery-ensembles of New Spain in the 16th century consisting of four vaulted quadrangular buildings located at the ends of the atrium outside them. Like the capilla abierta, religious figures were posed in it, so the name of it, is a unique solution and a contribution of the New Spain to universal art given its originality and the plastic and stylistic resources used in its ornamentation, with pre-Columbian and Baroque art elements. As paradigmatic examples are those of Huejotzingo and Calpan in Puebla, Mexico, which have an ornamental program made with tequitqui technique and based on medieval and Renaissance aesthetic canons, as a pure expression of syncretism.

The Convent of San Miguel in Huejotzingo dedicated its chapels with advocacy to John the Baptist, James the Great, Our Lady of the Assumption and Saints Peter and Paul; they have a square base of 5.40 m on each side. The accesses to the plant are opened with reduced arches of linked mouldings, related to the decoration of the doorway del Convent and the representative cord of Francis of Assisi.

There are several theories about its function. It has been proposed that, following the processional path, the capillas posas served to "pose" or rest the Blessed Sacrament when it was taken out in procession through the atrium. Researcher Carlos Chanfón has suggested a didactic function to house groups of students who were catechized, since one function of the atrium in these sets was the teaching not only of religion but of the norms and offices of Western life. It has also been proposed its use and relationship with the four neighborhoods that used to settle in the towns and cities following the typical Spanish pattern and of which each one was in charge in its cleaning and maintenance. According to Antonio Rubial, they were able to serve as burial mounds of indigenous rulers. Margarita Martínez del Sobral has proposed its use as hermitages for the temporary isolation of the friars.

Its origin has also been proposed in various ways. Carlos Chanfón has proposed his inspiration in the early churches and hermitages. According to the archaeological analysis of Mario Córdova Tello, its construction was not always part of the original design, as evidenced in the engravings of the capilla posa in the former Franciscan Convent of Huejotzingo, whose construction corresponds to the third stage (1545–1580) with engravings mentioning the year 1550.

See also
 Santa Monica Parish Church (Minalin)

References

Spanish Colonial architecture in Mexico
Roman Catholic churches in Mexico
Chapels
Architectural elements
Church architecture